This is a list of schools in the Central Queensland region of Queensland, Australia, and includes schools in Central West Queensland. The region is centred on the coastal cities of Rockhampton and Gladstone, and the inland towns of Emerald, Longreach and Barcaldine. It includes the following local government areas:

 Shire of Banana
 Shire of Barcaldine
 Shire of Barcoo 
 Blackall-Tambo Region
 Shire of Boulia
 Central Highlands Region
 Shire of Diamantina
 Gladstone Region
 Isaac Region
 Shire of Livingstone
 Shire of Longreach
 Rockhampton Region
 Aboriginal Shire of Woorabinda
 Shire of Winton

Prior to 2015, the Queensland education system consisted of primary schools, which accommodated students from kindergarten to Year 7 (ages 5–13), and high schools, which accommodate students from Years 8 to 12 (ages 12–18). However, from 2015, Year 7 became the first year of high school.

State schools

State primary schools

State high schools and colleges

Other state schools 

This includes special schools (schools for disabled children) and schools for specific purposes.

Defunct state schools

Private schools

Catholic schools
In Queensland, Catholic primary schools are usually (but not always) linked to a parish. Prior to the 1970s, most schools were founded by religious institutes, but with the decrease in membership of these institutes, together with major reforms inside the church, lay teachers and administrators began to take over the schools, a process which completed by approximately 1990.

Within the region, schools are administered by Catholic Education Office, Diocese of Rockhampton, which was established in 1966 and was the first Catholic Education Office (CEO) in Queensland. They are supported by the Queensland Catholic Education Commission, which is responsible for coordinating administration, curriculum and policy across the Catholic school system. Preference for enrolment is given to Catholic students from the parish or local area, although non-Catholic students are admitted if room is available.

Independent schools

Defunct private schools

See also 
List of schools in Queensland

References

External links
, a directory of Government schools in Queensland. (Department of Education and Training – Queensland Government)
CEO Rockhampton
About Independent schools at Independent Schools Queensland.

Central Queensland
LIst